Adel Abdul Aziz (born June 19, 1980) is a professional football wingback defender from the United Arab Emirates. He wears the number '13' jersey in the United Arab Emirates national football team.

At the club level, Abdulaziz played for Al-Ahli (Dubai) of the United Arab Emirates (UAE).

Abdulaziz joined the United Arab Emirates national football team in 2007 at the Gulf Cup, which his country wound up winning. He has also appeared in several qualifying matches for the 2010 FIFA World Cup.

References

External links

Living people
Emirati footballers
1980 births
Al Ahli Club (Dubai) players
People from the Emirate of Sharjah
UAE Pro League players
Association football fullbacks
United Arab Emirates international footballers